Trimethylene carbonate, or 1,3-propylene carbonate, is a 6-membered cyclic carbonate ester. It is a colourless solid that upon heating or catalytic ring-opening converts to poly(trimethylene carbonate) (PTMC).  Such polymers are called aliphatic polycarbonates and are of interest for potential biomedical applications.  An isomeric derivative is propylene carbonate, a colourless liquid that does not spontaneously polymerize.

Preparation
This compound may be prepared from 1,3-propanediol and ethyl chloroformate (a phosgene substitute), or from oxetane and carbon dioxide with an appropriate catalyst:

HOC3H6OH + ClCO2C2H5 → C3H6O2CO + C2H5OH + HCl
C3H6O + CO2 → C3H6O2CO

This cyclic carbonate undergoes ring-opening polymerization to give poly(trimethylene carbonate), abbreviated PTMC.

Medical devices
The polymer PTC is of commercial interest as a biodegradable polymer with biomedical applications. 
A block copolymer of glycolic acid and trimethylene carbonate (TMC) is the material of the Maxon suture, a monofilament resorbable suture which was introduced in the mid-1980s. The same material is used in other resorbable medical devices.

See also 

 Ethylene carbonate

References

Carbonate esters
Monomers